Asians in New York City represent the largest Asian diaspora of any city in the world.

Population

New York City alone, according to the 2010 Census, has now become home to more than one million Asian Americans, greater than the combined totals of San Francisco and Los Angeles. New York contains the highest total Asian population of any U.S. city proper.

Chinese New Yorkers

In 2020, approximately 9% of New York City’s population was of Chinese ethnicity, with about eighty percent of Chinese New Yorkers living in the boroughs of Queens and Brooklyn alone; New York City itself contains by far the highest ethnic Chinese population of any individual city outside Asia, estimated at 628,763 as of 2017. There is also a rising demand of Asian population choose to live in Long Island City. Much of the Chinese community lives in Chinatown, Brooklyn, Chinatown, Manhattan, Flushing, Queens, Long Island City, Queens and Sunset Park, Brooklyn.

South Asian New Yorkers

Indian and Indian Americans comprise the largest American municipal South Asian  diaspora,  comprising 2.4% of the city's population, with Bangladeshi and Bangladeshi Americans and people of Pakistani heritage at 0.7% and 0.5%, respectively. Queens is over 8% South Asian; 6-7% Indian. Tompkinsville, Staten Island has many Sri Lankans.

Korean New Yorkers

People of Korean heritage made up 1.2% of the city's population. They are more commonly in Flushing and Koreatown, Manhattan.

Filipino New Yorkers

Filipino and Filipino Americans were the largest southeast Asian ethnic group at 0.8%. The community has a stronghold in Woodside, Queens. Around 13,000 Filipino Americans and immigrants live in this area, equating to 15% of Woodside’s population.

Japanese New Yorkers

Japanese or Japanese American heritage people are 0.3% and have a presence in Manhattan.

Vietnamese New Yorkers
People of Vietnamese heritage made up 0.2% of New York City's population in 2010.

Organizations and activism
One of the partner research centers of the Asian American and Pacific Islander Policy Research Consortium is based at the City University of New York. New York University hosts the Program in Asian/Pacific/American Studies. "Serve the People: The Asian American Movement in New York" was an exhibition at Interference Archive from December 2013 - March 2014, supported by the Museum of Chinese in America.

Activist organizations:
 Asian American Federation of New York
 Asian American Legal Defense and Education Fund
 Asian Americans for Equality
 MinKwon Center for Community Action

Cultural organizations:
 Asian American Arts Centre
 Asian American Dance Theatre
 Asian American International Film Festival
 Asian American Writers' Workshop
 Asian Pacific American Heritage Festival
 Asian American Arts Alliance
 Happy Family Night Market

See also
Bangladeshis in New York City
Chinese people in New York City
Filipinos in the New York metropolitan area
Fuzhounese in New York City
Indians in the New York City metropolitan area
Japanese in New York City
Korean Americans in New York City
List of U.S. cities with significant Chinese-American populations
List of U.S. cities with significant Korean-American populations
Russians in New York City
Taiwanese people in New York City

References

Further reading
 "Asian Americans, New York City." Encyclopedia of Race, Ethnicity, and Society. Ed. Richard T. Schaefer. Vol. 1. Thousand Oaks, CA: SAGE Publications, 2008. 97-98. 

Ethnic groups in New York City